Cataract Falls can refer to

In Australia
Cataract Falls (Blue Mountains), in the Blue Mountains, New South Wales

In the United States
Cataract Falls in Marin County, California
Cataract Falls (Indiana) in Owen County, Indiana
 Cataract Falls in Waterfalls of Montana